The 1984 NAIA World Series was the 28th annual tournament hosted by the National Association of Intercollegiate Athletics to determine the national champion of baseball among its member colleges and universities in the United States and Canada.

The tournament was played, for the first time, at Harris Field in Lewiston, Idaho.

Emerging from the consolation bracket after losing their first game, hometown team Lewis–Clark State (51–13) defeated Azusa Pacific (39–24) in a single-game championship series, 15–2, to win the Warriors' first NAIA World Series. This would be the beginning of a nineteen-title dynasty for Lewis–Clark State at the NAIA level. 

Lewis–Clark State pitcher Trace Czyzewski was named tournament MVP.

Bracket

See also
 1984 NCAA Division I baseball tournament
 1984 NCAA Division II baseball tournament
 1984 NCAA Division III baseball tournament
 1984 NAIA Softball World Series

Reference

|NAIA World Series
NAIA World Series
NAIA World Series
NAIA World Series